Reversal is a 2001 movie about a high school wrestler, written by Jimi Petulla and directed by Alan Vint.  The movie, starring Danny Mousetis, chronicles the struggle of Leo Leone as he strives for the Pennsylvania state title and his dad's affection.  Coached by his father, Edward Leone (played by Jimi Petulla), he is constantly pushed towards this goal.  He is forced to decide between the approval of his father or his own wishes as he feels the strain from years of training and making weight. Kelly Boone (Vint), daughter of director Alan Vint, plays Leo Leone's secret girlfriend. Reversal is the only film they ever worked on together.  The movie never made it to the mainstream public, however, it received vocal support from many leaders in the wrestling community such as Cael Sanderson and Kurt Angle.

The soundtrack was composed by Jeff Danna.

References

External links
 
 

2001 films
2000s coming-of-age comedy-drama films
2001 independent films
Films scored by Jeff Danna
2000s sports comedy-drama films
American coming-of-age comedy-drama films
American independent films
American sports comedy-drama films
Sport wrestling films
2001 comedy films
2001 drama films
2000s English-language films
2000s American films